The rajah and pasha butterflies, also known as emperors in Africa and Australia, (genus Charaxes) make up the huge type genus of the brush-footed butterfly subfamily Charaxinae, or leafwing butterflies. They belong to the tribe Charaxini, which also includes the nawab butterflies (Polyura). Charaxes are tropical Old World butterflies, with by far the highest diversity in sub-Saharan Africa, a smaller number from South Asia to Melanesia and Australia, and a single species (C. jasius) in Europe. They are generally strong flyers and very popular among butterfly collectors.

Etymology
Charaxes means "to sharpen" or "to make pointed", referring to the pointed 'tails' on the hind wing. Charaxes may also be related to charax, meaning 'a sharp stake', or charaxis, a 'notch' or 'incision', which are also features of the hind wing.

Biology
Charaxes frequent sunny forest openings and glades where they rest with open or partly open wings sunning themselves. When alerted, they close the wings exposing the cryptic underside. Certain favoured perches are selected and intruders are chased and driven off, Charaxes feed in part at oozes from tree wounds infested with beetle or other larvae and on rotting fruit (they come to hanging traps baited with fermenting banana). They lay their eggs on small understorey or marginal trees. Tender shoots are usually selected for egg laying but as the larvae grow they move to older leaves. Larvae rest on the upper surface of a leaf on which they have spun a protecting silk pad.

The most striking features in the habits of Charaxes are the powerful rapid flight, the partiality to putrid matter and the constancy with which a specimen returns to the same spot. Few species are found in the open country (C. pelias pelias, C. jasius and C. fabius), where there are only bushes and rarely trees; most species inhabit the more wooded country and some are found only in and near larger forests. The males come often in some numbers to water pools on roads where they mud puddle; both sexes are fond of the juice of trees, decaying fruits, dung of animals and putrid meat and can successfully be entrapped by the use of such baits; one is known to come to flowers (C. zoolina). Some species locate mates by hill-topping.

The larvae feed variously on Rhamnaceae, Leguminosae, Sapindaceae, Melianthaceae, Euphorbiaceae, Gramineae, Ochnaceae, Lauraceae, Tiliaceae, Meliaceae, etc.

Charaxes acraeoides is part of a mimetic ring with Pseudacraea and Acraea. The closely related Charaxes fournierae mimics species of Euphaedra.

Life history
"We have examined the eggs of a number of species, taken from the bodies of dry specimens. Apart from size, there is no apparent difference in the eggs of the various species. The micropyle end is flattened, slightly concave, with the centre raised; from the centre radiate slight ribs, which gradually disappear at the sides and do not reach the base or underside; the longitudinal ribs are connected by extremely feeble transverse ridges, and bear, as Doherty correctly points out, small projecting points, which are easily visible under a good lens.

The slug-shaped caterpillar is widest in or before the middle, narrowed behind, and has a finely granulated skin. The head is flat, prognathous, and bears four processes which point backwards and are rough with tubercles, as is the hinder edge of the head between the processes; cheeks also tuberculated; the anal segment bears dorsally two more or less prominent processes, which are longer in the young larva than in the full-grown one. The colour of the larvae is generally green, often yellowish, the head bears, on each side, a light line which runs along the outer horn, and there is a spot on one or more abdominal segments, the colour of these latter markings, which are mostly more or less halfmoon-shaped, is as a rule buffish, the spots having often a darker (reddish or bluish) border. The caterpillar is a very slow creature, which does not voluntarily leave the twig on a leaf of which the egg was deposited.

The thick chrysalis is bright green as a rule, very smooth and shining, dorsally very convex; head bluntly bipartite; end of abdomen with two rounded tubercles ventrally."

Description of the imago
Adult Charaxes have a robust thorax and abdomen. Their wingspan is around 8 to 10 cm. The ground colours of the wing uppersides vary from tawny to black to pale. Wing markings may be spots, bars or bands of white, orange or blue. Some species have metallic blue spots and others have an overall iridescent, metallic gloss. Charaxes zingha is partially red and Charaxes eupale is light green. The males of the Charaxes etheocles complex are largely black and are known as the "black Charaxes".

The outer margin of the forewing varies from being nearly straight to deeply concave. The hindwing is abdominally always longer than costally, and in most species presents a triangular shape. The teeth on the distal (or outer) margin of both wings vary much according to species and groups of species, and is also not entirely constant within a species. The anal angle (wing corner) is in many species more pronounced than the outer margin between the tails, best seen in Charaxes zingha.

The pattern of the upperside is often very different in the sexes and in the various species. The females can be arranged according to the pattern of the upperside of the forewing into four groups:

Type 1: The discal and postdiscal interstices form a forked band, which is generally more or less interrupted at the veins into spots or patches. This is the normal type of female. There are many species in which the male has a similar band, but in this sex the patches composing the band are smaller than in the female.
Type 2: The upper discal interstitial patches become small or obsolete, while the postdiscal ones form together with the posterior discal ones an oblique band which extends from the costal to the internal margins. This type is found in both sexes of a number of species, and in the males of only a few others.
Type 3: The upper postdiscal interstitial spots are reduced in size or absent, while the discal interspaces and the posterior postdiscal ones form a broad curved band. This type does not occur in the male.
Type 4: The band is similar in appearance to that of type 3, but it is composed of the posterior postdiscal and discal interstices and the upper median ones, the band often entering the cell. This type is also confined to the female, and is met with only in one polychromatic species.

The underside is sometimes very colourful with orange, grey and auburn silver areas.

Sexual differences
Sexual dimorphism is among Charaxes a much commoner phenomenon than similarity of the sexes in colour and shape. The wings of the female are always broader than those of the male, and the hindwing is, as a rule, less triangular; the tails are broader, often widened at the end; in some species the male has one, the female two tails, in other the tails of the male are obliterated (absent), while the female possesses such an appendage.

Taxonomy

The taxonomy is complex with very many ranks (subspecies, forms and variants) and Charaxes demonstrates allopatric , sympatric speciation, parallel evolution and complex mimicry. There have been many rank and placement changes. Splitters, possibly with commercial as well as entomological interests, have named very many forms – an example is Georges Rousseau-Decelle. Many species show geographic and climatic (including altitudinal) clines. An additional problem is the publication of new taxa in journals which are not peer reviewed.

"No group of African butterflies arouses stronger emotions than Charaxes. Gaining an understanding of their phylogenetic relationships will add a new chapter to their convoluted literature".

Significant monographs on the taxonomy of Charaxes include:
 Arthur Gardiner Butler — Monograph of the species of Charaxes, a genus of diurnal Lepidoptera. Proceedings of the Zoological Society of London 1865:622-639 (1866)
 Walter Rothschild and Karl Jordan — A monograph of Charaxes and the allied prionopterous genera. Novitates Zoologicae 7:281-524. (1900)
 Per Olof Christopher Aurivillius — Nymphalidae: Die Gross-schmetterlinge des Afrikanischen Faunengebietes. In: Seitz, A.: Die Gross-schmetterlinge der Erde. Eine systematische Bearbeitung der bis jetzt bekannten Gross-schmetterlinge XIII. Alfred Kernen Verlag, Stuttgart. (1925).
 Victor Gurney Logan Van Someren — Revisional Notes on the African Charaxes. Pts 1–10. Bulletin of the British Museum (Natural History) (Entomology) (1963-1975).

Van Someren studied long series of museum specimens, drawing attention, as had his predecessors, to the variability of Charaxes species over their often vast range, identifying and describing subspecies and isolating new species. This clinal variation is complicated by variation associated with climate (season), altitude and mimicry. Van Someren recognizes species groups, the analysis is in part subjective and the number of taxa remains uncertain.

The type species of the genus Charaxes is Charaxes jasius.

Species groups

Defining species groups is a convenient way of subdividing well-defined genera with a large number of recognized species. Charaxes species are so arranged in assemblages called "species groups" (not superspecies, but an informal phenetic arrangement). These may or may not be clades. As molecular phylogenetic studies continue, lineages distinct enough to warrant some formal degree of recognition become evident and new groupings are suggested, but consistent ranking remains a problem.

Species
In older literature, some of the nawab butterflies, such as Polyura dolon, may be included under Charaxes.

Species not found in the Afrotropical realm

Charaxes jasius (Linnaeus, 1767)
Charaxes affinis (Butler, 1866)
Charaxes agrarius (Swinhoe, 1887)
Charaxes amycus (C. & R. Felder, 1861)
Charaxes antonius (Semper, 1878)
Charaxes aristogiton (C. & R. Felder, 1867)
Charaxes bernardus (Fabricius, 1793)
Charaxes borneensis (Butler, 1869)
Charaxes bupalus (Staudinger, 1889)
Charaxes echo (Butler, 1867)[stat.rev.2018]
Charaxes distanti (Honrath, 1885)
Charaxes durnfordi (Distant, 1884)
Charaxes elwesi (Joicey & Talbot, 1922)
Charaxes eurialus (Cramer, 1775)
Charaxes fervens (Butler, 1896)
Charaxes hannibal (Butler, 1869)[stat.rev.2018]
Charaxes harmodius (C. & R. Felder, (1867)
Charaxes kahruba (Moore, 1895)
Charaxes lampedo (Hübner, 1823)[stat.rev.2018]
Charaxes latona (Butler, 1866)
Charaxes marki (Male: Lane & Müller, [2006]; Female: Turlin, [2015])
Charaxes marmax (Westwood, 1847)
Charaxes mars (Staudinger, 1885)
Charaxes musashi (Tsukada, 1991)
Charaxes nitebis (Hewitson, 1859)
Charaxes ocellatus (Fruhstorfer, 1896)
Charaxes orilus (Butler, 1869)
Charaxes plateni (Staudinger, 1889)
Charaxes psaphon (Westwood, 1847)
Charaxes setan (Detani, 1983)
Charaxes solon (Fabricius, 1793)

Species found in the Afrotropical realm
Listed alphabetically. 

Recently updated taxonomy is referenced within the list. 

Charaxes achaemenes
Charaxes acraeoides
Charaxes acuminatus
Charaxes alpinus
Charaxes alticola
Charaxes amandae
Charaxes ameliae
Charaxes analava
Charaxes andara
Charaxes andranodorus
Charaxes angelae
Charaxes ansorgei
Charaxes antamboulou
Charaxes anticlea
Charaxes antiquus
Charaxes aubyni
Charaxes baileyi
Charaxes balfourii
Charaxes barnsi
Charaxes basquini
Charaxes baumanni
Charaxes berkeleyi
Charaxes bernardii
Charaxes bernstorffi
Charaxes bipunctatus
Charaxes blanda
Charaxes bocqueti
Charaxes bohemani
Charaxes boueti
Charaxes brainei
Charaxes brutus
Charaxes bwete
Charaxes cacuthis
Charaxes candiope
Charaxes carteri
Charaxes castor
Charaxes catachrous
Charaxes cedreatis
Charaxes chanleri
Charaxes chepalunga
Charaxes chevroti
Charaxes chintechi
Charaxes chunguensis
Charaxes cithaeron
Charaxes congdoni
Charaxes contrarius
Charaxes cowani
Charaxes cristalensis
Charaxes cynthia
Charaxes defulvata
Charaxes dilutus
Charaxes diversiforma
Charaxes doubledayi
Charaxes dowsetti
Charaxes dreuxi
Charaxes druceanus
Charaxes dubiosus
Charaxes ephyra
Charaxes epijasius[Stat.Rev.2005]
Charaxes etesipe
Charaxes ethalion
Charaxes etheocles
Charaxes eudoxus
Charaxes eupale
Charaxes figini
Charaxes fionae
Charaxes fournierae
Charaxes fulgurata
Charaxes fulvescens
Charaxes fuscus
Charaxes galawadiwosi
Charaxes gallagheri
Charaxes galleyanus
Charaxes gerdae
Charaxes grahamei
Charaxes guderiana
Charaxes hadrianus
Charaxes hansali
Charaxes hildebrandti
Charaxes howarthi
Charaxes imperialis
Charaxes jahlusa
Charaxes jolybouyeri
Charaxes junius
Charaxes kahldeni
Charaxes karkloof
Charaxes kheili
Charaxes kirki
Charaxes lactetinctus
Charaxes larseni
Charaxes lasti
Charaxes lecerfi
Charaxes legeri
Charaxes lemosi
Charaxes loandae
Charaxes lucretius
Charaxes lucyae
Charaxes lycurgus
Charaxes lydiae
Charaxes macclounii
Charaxes mafuga
Charaxes manica
Charaxes margaretae
Charaxes marieps
Charaxes martini
Charaxes matakall
Charaxes mccleeryi
Charaxes mixtus
Charaxes monteiri
Charaxes montis
Charaxes mtuiae
Charaxes murphyi
Charaxes musakensis
Charaxes mycerina
Charaxes nandina
Charaxes nicati
Charaxes nichetes
Charaxes nobilis
Charaxes northcotti
Charaxes numenes
Charaxes nyikensis
Charaxes nyungwensis
Charaxes obudoensis
Charaxes octavus
Charaxes odysseus
Charaxes opinatus
Charaxes overlaeti
Charaxes paphianus
Charaxes paradoxa
Charaxes pelias
Charaxes pembanus
Charaxes penricei
Charaxes petersi
Charaxes phaeus
Charaxes phenix
Charaxes phoebus
Charaxes phraortes
Charaxes plantroui
Charaxes pleione
Charaxes pollux
Charaxes pondoensis
Charaxes porthos
Charaxes prettejohni
Charaxes protoclea
Charaxes pseudophaeus
Charaxes pythodoris
Charaxes richelmanni
Charaxes saperanus
Charaxes saturnus[Stat.Rev.2005]
Charaxes schiltzei
Charaxes schultzei[Stat.Rev.2008] 
Charaxes sidamo
Charaxes smaragdalis
Charaxes subornatus
Charaxes subrubidus
Charaxes superbus
Charaxes taverniersi
Charaxes tectonis
Charaxes teissieri
Charaxes thomasius
Charaxes thysi
Charaxes tiridates
Charaxes turlini
Charaxes usambarae
Charaxes vansoni
Charaxes varanes
Charaxes variata
Charaxes velox
Charaxes viola
Charaxes violetta
Charaxes viossati
Charaxes virescens
Charaxes virilis
Charaxes williami
Charaxes xiphares
Charaxes zambeziensis
Charaxes zelica
Charaxes zingha
Charaxes zoolina

References

Further reading
 Darge, Philippe (1983). Fauna of Cameroon: The genus Charaxes, Sciences Nat, Venette, pp. 1–136, pl. 1-43. also as Le Genre Charaxes Ochs (Lepidoptera Charaxidae Doherty). Faune de la Republique Unie du Cameroon 1:1-136.
 Henning, Stephen Frank (1989). The Charaxinae Butterflies of Africa Aloe Books. Johannesburg. 
 Turlin, Bernard (2005-2007). Butterflies of the World. Erich Bauer, Thomas Franckenbach; Parts 22, 25, 28, 32, Charaxes 1-4. Goecke & Evers .
 Turlin, Bernard (2020). Butterflies of the World. Erich Bauer, Thomas Franckenbach; Part 47 (2 Vols.) Charaxes of Asia and Indo-Australia. Goecke & Evers, Keltern .
Victor Gurney Logan Van Someren (1963-1975). Revisional Notes on the African Charaxes. Pts 1-10. 652 pages 148 plates. This article gives part details and links to full text and plates (monochrome photos).
Rothschild, W. and Jordan, K. (1898). A monograph of Charaxes and the allied prionopterous genera. Novitates Zoologicae Volume 5:545-601 ; 1899 Volume 6: 220-286 : 1900 Volume 7:287-524.  Descriptions and plates (monochrome photos).
Müller, Chris J.; Wahlberg, Niklas; Beheregaray, Luciano B. (2010). After Africa: The evolutionary history and systematics of the genus Charaxes Ochsenheimer (Lepidoptera: Nymphalidae) in the Indo-Pacific region. Biological Journal of the Linnean Society 100(2): 457–481.
Jacques Plantrou, Jacques (1973). Note sur les Charaxes de l'Afrique occidentale. 1 (Lep. Nymphalidae). Bulletin de la Société Entomologique de France 78 (7-8):268-276.
Plantrou, Jacques (1974). Note sur les Charaxes de l'Afrique occidentale, 2 (Lep. Nymphalidae). Bulletin de la Société Entomologique de France 79 (5-6):125-131.
Plantrou, Jacques (1983). Systématique biogéographie et évolution des Charaxes africains (Lepidoptera Nymphalidae) Paris, Ecole normale supérieure, Laboratoire de zoologie (Series:Publications du Laboratoire de zoologie, Ecole normale supérieure, no 25.) .
Aduse-Poku K, Vingerhoedt E, Wahlberg N. (2009). Out-of-Africa again: a phylogenetic hypothesis of the genus Charaxes (Lepidoptera: Nymphalidae) based on five gene regions. Mol Phylogenet Evol. 53(2):463-78. doi: 10.1016/j.ympev.2009.06.021. Full text

External links

African Charaxes Eric Vingerhoedt Superb. In French as Charaxes Africains
Images at Bold
Charaxes at EOL
Pteron In Japanese, with an excellent photo collection. Identified images have binomial names.
TOL Tree of Life Clade.
SÁFIÁN Sz., COLLINS, S.C., KORMOS, B. SIKLÓSI, A. (2009): African Butterfly Database version 1.0 – www.abdb-africa.org Bibliography of African Charaxes via search.
African Butterfly Database Range maps via search

 
Charaxinae
Nymphalidae genera
Taxa named by Ferdinand Ochsenheimer